The following lists events that happened during 2000 in Sri Lanka.

Incumbents
President: Chandrika Kumaratunga
Prime Minister: Sirimavo Bandaranaike (until 9 August); Ratnasiri Wickremanayake (starting 10 August)
Chief Justice: Sarath N. Silva

Governors
 Central Province – Stanley Tillekeratne (until 2000); Tudor Dassanayake (starting 1 February)
 North Central Province – G. M. S. Samaraweera 
 North Eastern Province – Asoka Jayawardena  
 North Western Province – Siripala Jayaweera 
 Sabaragamuwa Province – C. N. Saliya Mathew 
 Southern Province – Ananda Dassanayake 
 Uva Province – Sirisena Amarasiri 
 Western Province – K. Vignarajah (until 2 January); Pathmanathan Ramanathan (starting 21 January)

Chief Ministers
 Central Province – Nandimithra Ekanayake (until 6 November); Sarath Ekanayake (starting 6 November)
 North Central Province – Berty Premalal Dissanayake
 North Western Province – S. B. Nawinne
 Sabaragamuwa Province – Athauda Seneviratne (until October); Asoka Jayawardena (starting October)
 Southern Province – Mahinda Yapa Abeywardena 
 Uva Province – Samaraweera Weerawanni
 Western Province – Susil Premajayanth (until 9 November); Reginald Cooray (starting 9 November)

Events
Susanthika Jayasinghe won a bronze medal in the women's 200m at the 2000 Sydney Olympics, the first Olympic medal won by a Sri Lankan woman.  Subsequent investigations revealed that the bronze medal won by Susanthika Jayasinghe was converted to a silver medal due to Marianne Jones, an American who won the gold medal in that event, being found guilty of a prohibited stimulant offense.
On 24 October 2000, President Chandrika Kumaratunga called for a parliamentary election, following harsh criticism regarding the Sri Lankan Civil War. The turnout went in favor of Chandrika, winning a total of 107 seats. The elections were marred by violence.  Seventy people were killed during the campaign, including six on election day itself.
On 25 December 2000, a Tropical Cyclone hit Sri Lanka causing nine fatalities and millions in property damage. This marked the largest cyclone to have hit Sri Lanka since 1978.
In the Spring of 2000, the Liberation Tigers of Tamil Eelam (LTTE) launched a series of successful offensives to retake strategic roads in the northern province. One major victory was the fall of the A9 Highway, which put the LTTE within striking range of the Elephant Pass military garrison.

Notes

a.  Gunaratna, Rohan. (1998). Pg.353, Sri Lanka's Ethnic Crisis and National Security, Colombo: South Asian Network on Conflict Research.

References

 
Years of the 21st century in Sri Lanka
Sri Lanka